Matsudaira's storm petrel (Hydrobates matsudairae) is a species of seabird in the family Hydrobatidae.

It breeds solely in the Volcano Islands in the northwest Pacific Ocean, and winters in the Indian Ocean.

Its common name and Latin binomial commemorate the Japanese ornithologist Yorikatsu Matsudaira. It was formerly defined in the genus Oceanodroma before that genus was synonymized with Hydrobates.

References

Matsudaira's storm petrel
Birds of Japan
Matsudaira's storm petrel
Matsudaira's storm petrel
Taxonomy articles created by Polbot